Jagbir Singh Brar is an Indian politician from the state of Punjab. He is a member of Shiromani Akali Dal. Brar won the seat of Jalandhar Cantt Assembly Constituency in the 2007 Punjab Legislative Assembly elections.  He is also former President of DCC Jalandhar. Brar served as a Block development panchayat officer before entering politics. Brar was appointed  Chairman of Punjab Water Resources Management and Development Corporation in 2019 by the Punjab Government.

Personal life
Brar is originally from Sri Muktsar Sahib but currently resides in Jalandhar with his family. He did his schooling from Muktsar and then went to Patiala for higher education.

Political career
Brar practiced law and later served as a BDPO before entering politics. He first contested and won the seat of Jalandhar cantt in 2007. He is a member of Shiromani Akali Dal. He is former DCC Jalandhar rural president. He resigned as PWRMDC Chief in 2021. He represented the Jalandhar Cantt Assembly Constituency of Punjab.

References

External links
Profile
 https://www.tribuneindia.com/mobi/news/jalandhar/jagbir-brar-is-pwrmdc-chief/825141.html

People from Sri Muktsar Sahib
Shiromani Akali Dal politicians
Living people
People from Jalandhar
Year of birth missing (living people)
Indian National Congress politicians from Punjab, India